The FN Tactical Sport Rifle (TSR) is a bolt-action sniper rifle produced by FN Herstal. It is based on the FN SPR which is known for its reliability and accuracy. The XP present in the model names signifies the rifles having extreme precision.

Design details
The TSR uses the same forge receiver containing a flat bottomed profile and integral recoil lug that is used on the SPR. The rifle also features a free-floating barrel which is hammer forged for enhanced accuracy.

Variants
The TSR XP USA (ultra short action) features a shorter action length. Unlike the standard XP, it is only offered in .223 Remington with a  barrel.

References

External links
 

7.62×51mm NATO rifles
Bolt-action rifles of Belgium
Sniper rifles of Belgium
FN Herstal firearms